Aşağı Qələnxur (also, Aşağı Gələnxur and Ashagy Gelenkhur) is a village in the Qusar Rayon of Azerbaijan.  The village forms part of the municipality of Nəcəfkənd.

References 

Populated places in Qusar District